The Department of Horticulture, Government of Punjab (Punjabi: ਬਾਗਬਾਨੀ ਵਿਭਾਗ, ਪੰਜਾਬ ਸਰਕਾਰ) is the apex body for horticultural development in the state of Punjab, India. It works for increasing  the land under horticultural crops, providing quality planting material, providing technical know-how to the farmers, reducing post harvest losses, etc.

The department is responsible for implementation of schemes such as MIDH, Agriculture Infrastructure Fund, Rashtriya Krishi Vikas Yojana, National Bee Keeping and Honey Mission and development of sericulture in the state.

Punjab Tissue Culture Based Seed Potato Act, 2020 

The Department of Horticulture, Punjab is the licensing authority for seed potato production and Director of Horticulture, Punjab is the appellate authority as per the Punjab Tissue Culture Based Seed Potato Act, 2020. The Punjab Cabinet approved Punjab Tissue Culture Based Seed Potato Act, 2020 on 30 Oct 2020. It came into effect on 6 Nov 2020. The purpose of this act is to provide for regulating the quality of potato seeds produced through tissue culture plants in aeroponics or nethouse, etc. This act makes certification and traceability of potato seed mandatory to ensure quality control. Its implementation helps to incentivize potato production, leading to greater diversification by bringing more area under potato crop cultivation

Agriculture Infrastructure Fund 
The Government of India launched Agriculture Infrastructure Fund on July 2020 with a corpus of Rs. 1,00,000 crores.to provide financial support to agri-entrepreneurs, start-ups, agri-tech players and farmer groups for infrastructure and logistics facilities. In this fund, Punjab state has been allotted INR 4713 crore. The Department of Horticulture is the state nodal agency for implementation of this scheme in Punjab.

The Department organizes stakeholder activities across the various districts of Punjab to maximize the implementation and awareness of the Agriculture Infrastructure Fund Scheme. Awareness camps have been organized in Bathinda, Patiala, etc. Districts of Sangrur, Patiala and Mansa are leading in availing benefits under this fund. The department also conducts activities in universities for the dissemination of information regarding this scheme.

Main features 

 Convergence with all schemes of central or state government.
 Project Management Unit to provide handholding support for projects including project preparation.
 Credit Guarantee for loans up to ₹ 2 Crore.
 Interest subvention of 3% p.a., limited to ₹ 2 crore per project in one location, though loan amount can be higher.
 Interest subvention will be available for a maximum period of 7 years.

Estates 
The Department of Horticulture, Punjab works to establish various estates across Punjab based on horticultural crops. These estates are equipped with the technological information and machinery to provide facilities to the horticulturists for producing high-quality fruits and cutting the cost of fruit production. Training and information dissemination activities are conducted in these estates for the farmers of the region. Citrus Estate, Hoshiarpur houses Punjab's first biofertilizer production laboratory.

Center of Excellence and other infrastructure 
The department has established Centers of Excellence for vegetables, fruits, potato and floriculture at Kartarpur, Hoshiarpur, Jalandhar, Ludhiana respectively. These centers function as sites for front line demonstrations, training as well as sources of quality planting material. Stakeholder activities are organized in these centers for development of horticulture in the state. Other infrastructure include potato seed farms, community canning centers, fruit preservation lab, landscape units, mushroom lab and nurseries.

References 

Government of Punjab, India